Splosh! was originally a British fetish magazine devoted to wet and messy fetishism. It featured pictures of, and stories about, men and women in wet and messy situations. First published in 1989, it was run by Clive Harris under the pseudonym "Bill Shipton".  Splosh also evolved into a wet and messy fetish video production house, releasing a whole string of movies, originally on VHS tape, then DVD and eventually, via Internet download stores.

The magazine ended in 2001 after 40 issues, and is widely regarded as the quintessential publication on the fetish, even giving rise to the eponymous term sploshing.

Following the end of the print magazine run, the Splosh website and its associated forum rose to prominence as a counterbalance to UMD.net, the scene's dominant forum. Several of the magazine's former models took part in video sketches released as digital downloads, such as Samantha-Jane Homden, Anne-Marie Dixon and Decadent Doll.

The success of Splosh! as a magazine was featured in Episode 4 of Season 1 of the Channel 5 TV show UK Raw in 2001.

Splosh! founder Clive Harris died suddenly on 12 July 2013.  Subsequently, in early 2014, the splosh.co.uk website was shut down, and on 31 March 2014 the three Splosh download stores hosted on the Vidown system, Splosh, Splosh Greatest Hits, and Splosh Messy Princess, were all shut down. It was believed at the time that the website closures would be permanent.

References

External links 
 Splosh! website (website subsequently re-opened)
 Eros Guide article: UK-Based Splosh! Magazine Puts Messy Sex on the Map
 UMD.net

Pornographic magazines published in the United Kingdom
Fetish magazines
Defunct magazines published in the United Kingdom
Magazines established in 1989
Magazines disestablished in 2014